Dublin Finglas was a parliamentary constituency represented in Dáil Éireann, the lower house of the Irish parliament or Oireachtas from 1977 to 1981. The constituency elected 3 deputies (Teachtaí Dála, commonly known as TDs) to the Dáil, using proportional representation by means of the single transferable vote (PR-STV).

History
The constituency was created in 1977, under the Electoral (Amendment) Act 1974, taking in much of the former Dublin North-West constituency together with parts of Dublin South-West, as part of the redistribution of constituencies which attempted to secure the re-election of the outgoing Fine Gael–Labour Party government. The constituency was abolished in 1981 with much of it going into a revived Dublin North-West constituency.

Its only election was notable for marking the debut in national politics of Bertie Ahern. Proinsias De Rossa also contested his first Dáil election here.

Boundaries
It covered the Finglas area of Dublin city, together with small parts of Drumcondra and Glasnevin. The 1974 Act defined the constituency's boundaries as consisting of the following wards of the county borough of Dublin: Drumcondra South C, Finglas East A, Finglas East B, Finglas East D, Finglas East E, Finglas East F, Finglas West A, Finglas West B, Finglas West C, Glasnevin B, Inns Quay A.

TDs

1977 general election

See also
Dáil constituencies
Politics of the Republic of Ireland
Historic Dáil constituencies
Elections in the Republic of Ireland

References

Dáil constituencies in County Dublin (historic)
Finglas
1977 establishments in Ireland
1981 disestablishments in Ireland
Constituencies established in 1977
Constituencies disestablished in 1981